Duliajan College, established in 1969, is a major and general degree college situated in Duliajan, Assam. This college is affiliated with the Dibrugarh University.

Departments

Science
Physics
Mathematics
Chemistry
Computer Science
Botany
Zoology

Arts and Commerce
 English
Education
Political Science
Sociology

References

External links
 

Universities and colleges in Assam
Colleges affiliated to Dibrugarh University
Educational institutions established in 1969
1969 establishments in Assam